La Cudera is a 2 km long glacier (2005) situated in the Silvretta Range in the canton of Graubünden in Switzerland. In 1973 it had an area of 2.07 km².

See also
List of glaciers in Switzerland
Swiss Alps

External links
Swiss glacier monitoring network

Glaciers of Graubünden